These Red Sea fish are listed as Reef-associated by Fishbase:
 
Acanthuridae 
Acanthurus gahhm, Black surgeonfish
Acanthurus mata, Elongate surgeonfish
Acanthurus nigrofuscus, Brown surgeonfish
Acanthurus sohal, Sohal surgeonfish
Acanthurus tennentii, Doubleband surgeonfish
Acanthurus xanthopterus, Yellowfin surgeonfish
Ctenochaetus striatus, Striated surgeonfish
Naso annulatus, Whitemargin unicornfish
Naso brevirostris, Spotted unicornfish
Naso elegans, Elegant unicornfish
Naso hexacanthus, Sleek unicornfish
Naso unicornis, Bluespine unicornfish
Zebrasoma desjardinii, Red Sea sailfin tang
Zebrasoma xanthurum, Yellowtail tang
Albulidae
Albula glossodonta, Roundjaw bonefish
Alopiidae
Alopias pelagicus, Pelagic thresher
Anomalopidae
Photoblepharon steinitzi, Flashlight fish
Antennariidae
Antennarius coccineus, Scarlet frogfish
Antennarius commerson, Commerson's frogfish
Antennarius hispidus, Shaggy frogfish
Antennarius nummifer, Spotfin frogfish
Antennarius pictus, Painted frogfish
Antennarius rosaceus, Spiny-tufted frogfish
Antennarius striatus, Striated frogfish
Antennatus tuberosus, Tuberculated frogfish
Histrio histrio, Sargassum fish
Apogonidae
Apogon angustatus, Broadstriped cardinalfish
Apogon annularis, Ringtail cardinalfish
Apogon aureus, Ring-tailed cardinalfish
Apogon bandanensis, Big-eyed cardinalfish
Apogon coccineus, Ruby cardinalfish
Apogon cookii, Cook's cardinalfish
Apogon cyanosoma, Yellow-striped cardinalfish
Apogon exostigma, Narrowstripe cardinalfish
Apogon fasciatus, Broad-banded cardinalfish
Apogon fleurieu, Cardinalfish
Apogon fraenatus, Bridled cardinalfish
Apogon guamensis, Guam cardinalfish
Apogon heptastygma
Apogon isus
Apogon kallopterus, Iridescent cardinalfish
Apogon kiensis, Rifle cardinal
Apogon lateralis, Humpback cardinal
Apogon latus
Apogon leptacanthus, Threadfin cardinalfish
Apogon multitaeniatus, Smallscale cardinal
Apogon nigripinnis, Bullseye
Apogon nigrofasciatus, Blackstripe cardinalfish
Apogon pselion
Apogon pseudotaeniatus, Doublebar cardinalfish
Apogon savayensis, Samoan cardinalfish
Apogon semiornatus, Oblique-banded cardinalfish
Apogon taeniatus, Twobelt cardinal
Apogon taeniophorus, Reef-flat cardinalfish
Apogon timorensis, Timor cardinalfish
Apogon truncatus, Flagfin cardinalfish
Apogon zebrinus
Apogonichthys perdix, Perdix cardinalfish
Archamia bilineata
Archamia fucata, Orange-lined cardinalfish
Archamia lineolata, Shimmering cardinal
Cheilodipterus arabicus, Tiger cardinal
Cheilodipterus lachneri
Cheilodipterus macrodon, Large toothed cardinalfish
Cheilodipterus quinquelineatus, Five-lined cardinalfish
Fowleria aurita, Crosseyed cardinalfish
Fowleria marmorata, Marbled cardinalfish
Fowleria punctulata, Spotcheek cardinalfish
Fowleria vaiulae, Mottled cardinalfish
Fowleria variegata, Variegated cardinalfish
Gymnapogon melanogaster
Neamia octospina, Eightspine cardinalfish
Pseudamia gelatinosa, Gelatinous cardinalfish
Rhabdamia cypselura, Swallowtail cardinalfish
Rhabdamia nigrimentum
Atherinidae
Atherinomorus lacunosus, Hardyhead silverside
Hypoatherina barnesi, Barnes' silverside
Hypoatherina temminckii, Samoan silverside
Balistidae
Abalistes stellatus
Balistapus undulatus, Orange-lined triggerfish
Balistoides viridescens, Titan triggerfish
Canthidermis maculata, Spotted oceanic triggerfish
Melichthys indicus, Indian triggerfish
Odonus niger, Redtoothed triggerfish
Pseudobalistes flavimarginatus, Yellowmargin triggerfish
Pseudobalistes fuscus, Yellow-spotted triggerfish
Rhinecanthus aculeatus, Blackbar triggerfish
Rhinecanthus assasi, Picasso triggerfish
Rhinecanthus rectangulus, Wedge-tail triggerfish
Rhinecanthus verrucosus, Blackbelly triggerfish
Sufflamen albicaudatum, Bluethroat triggerfish
Sufflamen fraenatum, Masked triggerfish
Belonidae
Ablennes hians, Flat needlefish
Tylosurus acus melanotus, Keel-jawed needle fish
Tylosurus crocodilus crocodilus, Hound needlefish
Blenniidae
Aspidontus dussumieri, Lance blenny
Aspidontus taeniatus, False cleanerfish
Aspidontus tractus
Atrosalarias fuscus fuscus
Blenniella cyanostigma, Striped rockskipper
Blenniella periophthalmus, Blue-dashed rockskipper
Cirripectes castaneus, Chestnut eyelash-blenny
Cirripectes filamentosus, Filamentous blenny
Ecsenius aroni, Aron's blenny
Ecsenius frontalis, Smooth-fin blenny
Ecsenius gravieri, Red Sea mimic blenny
Ecsenius midas, Persian blenny
Ecsenius nalolo, Nalolo
Enchelyurus kraussii, Krauss' blenny
Exallias brevis, Leopard blenny
Istiblennius edentulus, Rippled rockskipper
Istiblennius rivulatus
Meiacanthus nigrolineatus, Blackline fangblenny
Mimoblennius cirrosus, Fringed blenny
Omobranchus punctatus, Muzzled blenny
Petroscirtes mitratus, Floral blenny
Plagiotremus rhinorhynchos, Bluestriped fangblenny
Plagiotremus tapeinosoma, Piano fangblenny
Plagiotremus townsendi, Townsend's fangblenny
Salarias fasciatus, Jewelled blenny
Bothidae
Asterorhombus intermedius, Intermediate flounder
Bothus mancus, Flowery flounder
Bothus pantherinus, Leopard flounder
Engyprosopon grandisquama, Largescale flounder
Bythitidae
Brosmophyciops pautzkei, Slimy cuskeel
Caesionidae
Caesio caerulaurea, Blue and gold fusilier
Caesio lunaris, Lunar fusilier
Caesio striata, Striated fusilier
Caesio suevica, Suez fusilier
Caesio varilineata, Variable-lined fusilier
Caesio xanthonota, Yellowback fusilier
Gymnocaesio gymnoptera, Slender fusilier
Pterocaesio chrysozona, Goldband fusilier
Pterocaesio pisang, Banana fusilier
Callionymidae
Callionymus delicatulus, Delicate dragonet
Callionymus flavus
Carangidae
Alectis ciliaris, African pompano
Alectis indicus, Indian threadfish
Alepes djedaba, Shrimp scad
Atule mate, Yellowtail scad
Carangoides armatus, Longfin trevally
Carangoides bajad, Orangespotted trevally
Carangoides chrysophrys, Longnose trevally
Carangoides coeruleopinnatus, Coastal trevally
Carangoides dinema, Shadow trevally
Carangoides ferdau, Blue trevally
Carangoides fulvoguttatus, Yellowspotted trevally
Carangoides gymnostethus, Bludger
Carangoides malabaricus, Malabar trevally
Carangoides orthogrammus, Island trevally
Carangoides plagiotaenia, Barcheek trevally
Caranx ignobilis, Giant trevally
Caranx melampygus, Bluefin trevally
Caranx sexfasciatus, Bigeye trevally
Decapterus macrosoma, Shortfin scad
Elagatis bipinnulata, Rainbow runner
Gnathanodon speciosus, Golden trevally
Megalaspis cordyla, Torpedo scad
Naucrates ductor, Pilotfish
Parastromateus niger, Black pomfret
Scomberoides commersonnianus, Talang queenfish
Scomberoides lysan, Doublespotted queenfish
Scomberoides tol, Needlescaled queenfish
Selar crumenophthalmus, Bigeye scad
Seriola dumerili, Greater amberjack
Seriolina nigrofasciata, Blackbanded trevally
Trachinotus baillonii, Smallspotted dart
Trachinotus blochii, Snubnose pompano
Trachurus indicus, Arabian scad
Ulua mentalis, Longrakered trevally
Uraspis helvola, Whitemouth jack
Uraspis uraspis, Whitetongue jack
Carapidae
Encheliophis gracilis, Graceful pearlfish
Encheliophis homei, Silver pearlfish
Carcharhinidae
Carcharhinus albimarginatus, Silvertip shark
Carcharhinus altimus, Bignose shark
Carcharhinus brevipinna, Spinner shark
Carcharhinus falciformis, Silky shark
Carcharhinus limbatus, Blacktip shark
Carcharhinus longimanus, Oceanic whitetip shark
Carcharhinus melanopterus, Blacktip reef shark
Carcharhinus plumbeus, Sandbar shark
Carcharhinus sorrah, Spottail shark
Galeocerdo cuvier, Tiger shark
Negaprion acutidens, Sicklefin lemon shark
Triaenodon obesus, Whitetip reef shark
Centriscidae
Aeoliscus punctulatus, Speckled shrimpfish
Centriscus scutatus, Grooved razor-fish
Chaetodontidae
Chaetodon auriga, Threadfin butterflyfish
Chaetodon austriacus, Blacktail butterflyfish
Chaetodon citrinellus, Speckled butterflyfish
Chaetodon collare, Redtail butterflyfish
Chaetodon falcula, Blackwedged butterflyfish
Chaetodon fasciatus, Diagonal butterflyfish
Chaetodon guttatissimus, Peppered butterflyfish
Chaetodon kleinii, Sunburst butterflyfish
Chaetodon larvatus, Hooded butterflyfish
Chaetodon leucopleura, Somali butterflyfish
Chaetodon lineolatus, Lined butterflyfish
Chaetodon melannotus, Blackback butterflyfish
Chaetodon melapterus, Arabian butterflyfish
Chaetodon mesoleucos, White-face butterflyfish
Chaetodon paucifasciatus, Eritrean butterflyfish
Chaetodon semilarvatus, Bluecheek butterflyfish
Chaetodon trifascialis, Chevron butterflyfish
Chaetodon trifasciatus, Melon butterflyfish
Chaetodon vagabundus, Vagabond butterflyfish
Forcipiger flavissimus
Forcipiger longirostris, Longnose butterflyfish
Heniochus intermedius, Red Sea bannerfish
Heniochus monoceros, Masked bannerfish
Chirocentridae
Chirocentrus dorab, Dorab wolf-herring
Cirrhitidae
Cirrhitichthys calliurus, Spottedtail hawkfish
Cirrhitichthys oxycephalus, Coral hawkfish
Cirrhitus pinnulatus, Stocky hawkfish
Oxycirrhites typus, Longnose hawkfish
Paracirrhites forsteri, Blackside hawkfish
Clupeidae
Amblygaster sirm, Spotted sardinella
Herklotsichthys quadrimaculatus, Bluestripe herring
Sardinella albella, White sardinella
Sardinella gibbosa, Goldstripe sardinella
Spratelloides delicatulus, Delicate round herring
Congridae
Ariosoma balearicum, Bandtooth conger
Ariosoma scheelei, Tropical conger
Conger cinereus, Longfin African conger
Heteroconger hassi, Spotted garden eel
Dactylopteridae
Dactyloptena orientalis, Oriental flying gurnard
Dasyatidae
Dasyatis kuhlii, Bluespotted stingray
Himantura uarnak, Honeycomb stingray
Pastinachus sephen, Cowtail stingray
Taeniura lymma, Bluespotted ribbontail ray
Taeniura meyeni, Blotched fantail ray
Urogymnus asperrimus, Porcupine ray
Diodontidae
Cyclichthys orbicularis, Birdbeak burrfish
Cyclichthys spilostylus, Spotbase burrfish
Diodon holocanthus, Long-spine porcupinefish
Diodon hystrix, Spot-fin porcupinefish
Diodon liturosus, Black-blotched porcupinefish
Drepaneidae
Drepane longimana, Concertina fish
Drepane punctata, Spotted sicklefish
Echeneidae
Echeneis naucrates, Live sharksucker
Remora remora, Common remora
Engraulidae
Encrasicholina heteroloba, Shorthead anchovy
Encrasicholina punctifer, Buccaneer anchovy
Thryssa baelama, Baelama anchovy
Ephippidae
Platax orbicularis, Orbicular batfish
Platax teira, Tiera batfish
Tripterodon orbis, African spadefish
Fistulariidae
Fistularia commersonii, Bluespotted cornetfish
Fistularia petimba, Red cornetfish
Gerreidae
Gerres argyreus, Common mojarra
Gerres longirostris, Longtail silverbiddy
Gerres oblongus, Slender silverbiddy
Gerres oyena, Common silver-biddy
GinglymostomatidaeNebrius ferrugineus, Tawny nurse shark
GobiesocidaeLepadichthys lineatus, Doubleline clingfish
GobiidaeAmblyeleotris diagonalisAmblyeleotris periophthalma, Periophthalma prawn-gobyAmblyeleotris steinitzi, Steinitz' prawn gobyAmblyeleotris sungami, Magnus' prawn-gobyAmblyeleotris wheeleri, Gorgeous prawn-gobyAmblygobius albimaculatus, Butterfly gobyAmblygobius esakiae, Snoutspot gobyAmblygobius hectori, Hector's gobyAmblygobius nocturnus, Nocturn gobyAsterropteryx ensifera, Miller's damselAsterropteryx semipunctata, Starry gobyBathygobius cyclopterus, Spotted frillgobyBathygobius fuscus, Dusky frillgobyBryaninops erythrops, Erythrops gobyBryaninops loki, Loki whip-gobyBryaninops natans, Redeye gobyBryaninops ridens, Ridens gobyBryaninops yongei, Whip coral gobyCallogobius bifasciatus, Doublebar gobyCallogobius maculipinnis, Ostrich gobyCryptocentrus caeruleopunctatus, Harlequin prawn-gobyCryptocentrus cryptocentrus, Ninebar prawn-gobyCryptocentrus fasciatus, Y-bar shrimp gobyCryptocentrus lutheri, Luther's prawn-gobyCtenogobiops crocineus, Silverspot shrimpgobyCtenogobiops feroculus, Sandy prawn-gobyCtenogobiops maculosusDiscordipinna griessingeri, Spikefin gobyEviota distigma, Twospot pygmy gobyEviota guttata, Spotted pygmy gobyEviota pardalota, Leopard dwarfgobyEviota prasina, Green bubble gobyEviota sebreei, Sebree's pygmy gobyEviota zebrinaExyrias belissimus, Mud reef-gobyFlabelligobius latruncularia, Fan shrimp-gobyFusigobius longispinus, Orange-spotted sand-gobyFusigobius neophytus, Common fusegobyGladiogobius ensifer, Gladiator gobyGnatholepis anjerensisGnatholepis cauerensis cauerensis, Eyebar gobyGobiodon citrinus, Poison gobyGobiodon reticulatus, Reticulate gobyIstigobius decoratus, Decorated gobyIstigobius ornatus, Ornate gobyLuposicya lupusOplopomus oplopomus, Spinecheek gobyOxyurichthys papuensis, Frogface gobyPalutrus meteori, Meteor gobyParagobiodon echinocephalus, Redhead gobyParagobiodon xanthosomus, Emerald coral gobyPeriophthalmus argentilineatus, Barred mudskipperPleurosicya mossambica, Toothy gobyPriolepis cinctus, Girdled gobyPriolepis randalli, Randall's gobyPriolepis semidoliata, Half-barred gobyTrimma avidoriTrimma barralliTrimma fishelsoniTrimma flavicaudatusTrimma mendelssohniTrimma sheppardiTrimma taylori, Yellow cave gobyTrimma tevegae, Blue-striped cave gobyValenciennea helsdingenii, Twostripe gobyValenciennea puellaris, Maiden gobyValenciennea sexguttata, Sixspot gobyValenciennea wardii, Ward's sleeperVanderhorstia delagoae, Candystick gobyVanderhorstia mertensi, Mertens' prawn-gobyYongeichthys nebulosus, Shadow goby
HaemulidaeDiagramma pictum, Painted sweetlipsPlectorhinchus albovittatus, Two-striped sweetlipsPlectorhinchus flavomaculatus, Lemon sweetlipPlectorhinchus gaterinus, Blackspotted rubberlipPlectorhinchus gibbosus, Harry hotlipsPlectorhinchus harrawayiPlectorhinchus nigrusPlectorhinchus obscurus, Giant sweetlipsPlectorhinchus playfairi, Whitebarred rubberlipPlectorhinchus schotaf, Minstrel sweetlipPlectorhinchus sordidus, Sordid rubberlipPlectorhinchus umbrinusPomadasys commersonnii, Smallspotted grunterPomadasys furcatus, Banded grunterPomadasys kaakan, Javelin grunterPomadasys maculatus, Saddle gruntPomadasys olivaceus, Olive gruntPomadasys stridens, Striped piggy
HemiramphidaeHemiramphus far, Blackbarred halfbeakHyporhamphus affinis, Tropical halfbeakHyporhamphus balinensis, Balinese garfishHyporhamphus gamberur, Red Sea halfbeak
HolocentridaeMyripristis berndti, Blotcheye soldierfishMyripristis hexagona, Doubletooth soldierfishMyripristis murdjan, Pinecone soldierfishMyripristis xanthacra, Yellowtip soldierfishNeoniphon sammara, Sammara squirrelfishSargocentron caudimaculatum, Silverspot squirrelfishAdioryx diadema, Crown squirrelfishSargocentron inaequalis, Lattice squirrelfishSargocentron ittodai, Samurai squirrelfishSargocentron macrosquamis, Bigscale squirrelfishSargocentron melanospilos, Blackblotch squirrelfishSargocentron punctatissimum, Speckled squirrelfishSargocentron rubrum, RedcoatSargocentron spiniferum, Sabre squirrelfish
KuhliidaeKuhlia mugil, Barred flagtail
KyphosidaeKyphosus bigibbus, Grey sea chubKyphosus cinerascens, Blue seachubKyphosus vaigiensis, Brassy chub
LabridaeAnampses caeruleopunctatus, Bluespotted wrasseAnampses lineatus, Lined wrasseAnampses meleagrides, Spotted wrasseAnampses twistii, Yellowbreasted wrasseBodianus anthioides, Lyretail hogfishBodianus axillaris, Axilspot hogfishBodianus diana, Diana's hogfishBodianus opercularis, Blackspot hogfishCheilinus fasciatus, Redbreast wrasseCheilinus lunulatus, Broomtail wrasseCheilinus undulatus, Humphead wrasseCheilio inermis, Cigar wrasseChoerodon robustus, Robust tuskfishCirrhilabrus blatteus, Purple-boned wrasseCirrhilabrus rubriventralis, Social wrasseCoris aygula, Clown corisCoris caudimacula, Spottail corisCoris cuvieri, African corisCoris formosa, Queen corisCoris variegata, Dapple corisEpibulus insidiator, Slingjaw wrasseGomphosus caeruleus, Green birdmouth wrasseHalichoeres hortulanus, Checkerboard wrasseHalichoeres iridisHalichoeres margaritaceus, Pink-belly wrasseHalichoeres marginatus, Dusky wrasseHalichoeres nebulosus, Nebulous wrasseHalichoeres scapularis, Zigzag wrasseHalichoeres zeylonicus, Goldstripe wrasseHemigymnus fasciatus, Barred thicklipHemigymnus melapterus, Blackeye thicklipHologymnosus annulatus, Ring wrasseIniistius pavo, Peacock wrasseLabroides dimidiatus, Bluestreak cleaner wrasseLarabicus quadrilineatus, Fourline wrasseMacropharyngodon bipartitus bipartitus, Vermiculate wrasseMacropharyngodon bipartitus marisrubriMinilabrus striatus, Minute wrasseNovaculichthys macrolepidotus, Seagrass wrasseNovaculichthys taeniourus, Rockmover wrasseOxycheilinus arenatus, Speckled maori wrasseOxycheilinus bimaculatus, Two-spot wrasseOxycheilinus digramma, Cheeklined wrasseOxycheilinus mentalis, Mental wrasseParacheilinus octotaenia, Red Sea eightline flasherPseudocheilinus evanidus, Striated wrassePseudocheilinus hexataenia, Sixline wrassePseudodax moluccanus, Chiseltooth wrassePteragogus cryptus, Cryptic wrassePteragogus flagellifer, Cocktail wrasseStethojulis albovittata, Bluelined wrasseStethojulis interrupta, Cutribbon wrasseStethojulis strigiventer, Three-ribbon wrasseStethojulis trilineata, Three-lined rainbowfishThalassoma hebraicum, Goldbar wrasseThalassoma lunare, Moon wrasseThalassoma purpureum, Surge wrasseThalassoma rueppellii, Klunzinger's wrasseThalassoma trilobatum, Christmas wrasseWetmorella nigropinnata, Sharpnose wrasseXyrichtys melanopus, Yellowpatch razorfishXyrichtys pentadactylus, Fivefinger wrasse
LamnidaeCarcharodon carcharias, Great white sharkIsurus oxyrinchus, Shortfin mako
LethrinidaeGymnocranius grandoculis, Blue-lined large-eye breamGymnocranius griseus, Grey large-eye breamLethrinus borbonicus, Snubnose emperorLethrinus erythracanthus, Orange-spotted emperorLethrinus harak, Thumbprint emperorLethrinus lentjan, Pink ear emperorLethrinus mahsena, Sky emperorLethrinus microdon, Smalltooth emperorLethrinus nebulosus, Spangled emperorLethrinus obsoletus, Orange-striped emperorLethrinus olivaceus, Longface emperorLethrinus variegatus, Slender emperorLethrinus xanthochilus, Yellowlip emperorMonotaxis grandoculis, Humpnose big-eye bream
LutjanidaeAphareus furca, Small toothed jobfishAphareus rutilans, Rusty jobfishAprion virescens, Green jobfishLutjanus argentimaculatus, Mangrove red snapperLutjanus bengalensis, Bengal snapperLutjanus bohar, Two-spot red snapperLutjanus coeruleolineatus, Blueline snapperLutjanus ehrenbergii, Blackspot snapperLutjanus erythropterus, Crimson snapperLutjanus fulviflamma, Dory snapperLutjanus fulvus, Blacktail snapperLutjanus gibbus, Humpback red snapperLutjanus johnii, John's snapperLutjanus kasmira, Common bluestripe snapperLutjanus lemniscatus, Yellowstreaked snapperLutjanus lutjanus, Bigeye snapperLutjanus malabaricus, Malabar blood snapperLutjanus monostigma, Onespot snapperLutjanus quinquelineatus, Five-lined snapperLutjanus rivulatus, Blubberlip snapperLutjanus russellii, Russell's snapperLutjanus sanguineus, Humphead snapperLutjanus sebae, Emperor red snapperMacolor niger, Black and white snapperParacaesio sordida, Dirty ordure snapperParacaesio xanthura, Yellowtail blue snapperPinjalo pinjalo, Pinjalo
MalacanthidaeMalacanthus brevirostris, QuakerfishMalacanthus latovittatus, Blue blanquillo
MenidaeMene maculata, Moonfish
MicrodesmidaeGunnellichthys monostigma, Onespot wormfish
MonacanthidaeAluterus monoceros, Unicorn leatherjacketAluterus scriptus, Scrawled filefishAmanses scopas, Broom filefishCantherhines dumerilii, Whitespotted filefishCantherhines pardalis, Honeycomb filefishOxymonacanthus halli, Red Sea longnose filefishParamonacanthus japonicus, Hairfinned leatherjacketPervagor randalliThamnaconus modestoides, Modest filefishMonocentris japonica, Pineconefish
MonodactylidaeMonodactylus falciformis, Full moony
MugilidaeCrenimugil crenilabis, Fringelip mulletLiza vaigiensis, Squaretail mulletOedalechilus labiosus, Hornlip mulletValamugil seheli, Bluespot mullet
MullidaeMulloidichthys flavolineatus, Yellowstripe goatfishMulloidichthys vanicolensis, Yellowfin goatfishParupeneus cyclostomus, Goldsaddle goatfishParupeneus forsskali, Red Sea goatfishParupeneus heptacanthus, Cinnabar goatfishParupeneus indicus, Indian goatfishParupeneus macronemus, Longbarbel goatfishParupeneus rubescens, Rosy goatfishUpeneus moluccensis, Goldband goatfishUpeneus tragula, Freckled goatfishUpeneus vittatus, Yellowstriped goatfish
MuraenidaeEchidna nebulosa, Snowflake morayEchidna polyzona, Barred morayGymnomuraena zebra, Zebra morayGymnothorax buroensis, Vagrant morayGymnothorax elegans, Elegant morayGymnothorax favagineus, Laced morayGymnothorax flavimarginatus, Yellow-edged morayGymnothorax griseus, Geometric morayGymnothorax hepaticus, Liver-colored moray eelGymnothorax javanicus, Giant morayGymnothorax meleagris, Turkey morayGymnothorax moluccensis, Moluccan morayGymnothorax monochrous, Drab morayGymnothorax nudivomer, Starry morayGymnothorax pictus, Peppered morayGymnothorax pindae, Pinda morayGymnothorax punctatofasciatus, Bars'n spots morayGymnothorax punctatus, Red Sea whitespotted morayGymnothorax rueppelliae, Banded morayGymnothorax undulatus, Undulated morayStrophidon sathete, Slender giant morayUropterygius concolor, Unicolor snake morayUropterygius polyspilus, Large-spotted snake moray
MyliobatidaeAetobatus narinari, Spotted eagle ray
NemipteridaeScolopsis bimaculatus, Thumbprint monocle breamScolopsis ghanam, Arabian monocle breamScolopsis taeniatus, Black-streaked monocle breamScolopsis vosmeri, Whitecheek monocle bream
OdontaspididaeCarcharias taurus, Sand tiger shark
OphichthidaeBrachysomophis cirrocheilos, Stargazer snake eelCallechelys catostoma, Black-striped snake eelCallechelys marmorata, Marbled snake eelLamnostoma orientalis, Oriental worm-eelMuraenichthys schultzei, Maimed snake eelMyrichthys colubrinus, Harlequin snake eelMyrichthys maculosus, Tiger snake eelOphichthus erabo, Fowler's snake eelPhaenomonas cooperae, Short-maned sand-eelPisodonophis cancrivorus, Longfin snake-eelScolecenchelys gymnota, Slender worm eelScolecenchelys laticaudata, Redfin worm-eel
OphidiidaeBrotula multibarbata, Goatsbeard brotula
OpistognathidaeOpistognathus muscatensis, Robust jawfish
OstraciidaeLactoria cornuta, Longhorn cowfishOstracion cubicus, Yellow boxfishOstracion cyanurus, Bluetail trunkfishTetrosomus gibbosus, Humpback turretfish
PegasidaeEurypegasus draconis, Short dragonfish
PempheridaeParapriacanthus ransonneti, Pigmy sweeperPempheris oualensis, Silver sweeperPempheris schwenkii, Black-stripe sweeperPempheris vanicolensis, Vanikoro sweeper
PentacerotidaeHistiopterus typus, Sailfin armourhead
PinguipedidaeParapercis hexophtalma, Speckled sandperch
PlatycephalidaeCociella punctata, Spotted flatheadPapilloculiceps longiceps, Tentacled flatheadPlatycephalus indicus, Bartail flatheadThysanophrys chiltonae, Longsnout flathead
PlesiopidaeCalloplesiops altivelis, CometPlesiops coeruleolineatus, Crimsontip longfinPlesiops nigricans, Whitespotted longfin
PlotosidaePlotosus lineatus, Striped eel catfish
PomacanthidaeApolemichthys xanthotis, Yellow-ear angelfishCentropyge bicolor, Bicolor angelfishCentropyge multispinis, Dusky angelfishGenicanthus caudovittatus, Zebra angelfishPomacanthus asfur, Arabian angelfishPomacanthus imperator, Emperor angelfishPomacanthus maculosus, Yellowbar angelfishPomacanthus semicirculatus, Semicircle angelfishPygoplites diacanthus, Royal angelfish
PomacentridaeAbudefduf bengalensis, Bengal sergeantAbudefduf septemfasciatus, Banded sergeantAbudefduf sexfasciatus, Scissortail sergeantAbudefduf sordidus, Blackspot sergeantAbudefduf vaigiensis, Indo-Pacific sergeant(Quoy and Gaimard, 1825)Amblyglyphidodon flavilatus, Yellowfin damselAmblyglyphidodon indicus, Pale damselfish Amblyglyphidodon leucogaster, Yellowbelly damselfishAmphiprion bicinctus, Twoband anemonefishChromis dimidiata, Chocolatedip chromisChromis flavaxilla, Arabian chromisChromis nigrura, Blacktail chromisChromis pelloura, Duskytail chromisChromis pembae, Pemba chromisChromis ternatensis, Ternate chromisChromis trialpha, Trispot chromisChromis viridis, Blue green damselfishChromis weberi, Weber's chromisChrysiptera annulata, Footballer demoiselleChrysiptera biocellata, Twinspot damselfishChrysiptera unimaculata, One-spot demoiselleDascyllus aruanus, Whitetail dascyllusDascyllus marginatus, Marginate dascyllusDascyllus trimaculatus, Threespot dascyllusNeoglyphidodon melas, Bowtie damselfishNeopomacentrus cyanomos, Regal demoiselleNeopomacentrus miryae, Miry's demoiselleNeopomacentrus xanthurus, Red Sea demoisellePlectroglyphidodon lacrymatus, Whitespotted devilPlectroglyphidodon leucozonus, Singlebar devilPomacentrus albicaudatus, Whitefin damselPomacentrus aquilus, Dark damselPomacentrus leptus, Slender damselPomacentrus pavo, Sapphire damselPomacentrus sulfureus, Sulphur damselPomacentrus trichourus, Paletail damselPomacentrus trilineatus, Threeline damselPristotis cyanostigma, Bluedotted damselPristotis obtusirostris, Gulf damselfishStegastes lividus, Blunt snout gregoryStegastes nigricans, Dusky farmerfishTeixeirichthys jordani, Jordan's damsel
PriacanthidaeHeteropriacanthus cruentatus, GlasseyePriacanthus blochii, Paeony bulleyePriacanthus hamrur, Moontail bullseyePristigenys niphonia, Japanese bigeye
PristidaePristis pectinata, Smalltooth sawfish
PseudochromidaeChlidichthys johnvoelckeri, Cerise dottybackHaliophis guttatus, African eel blennyPectinochromis lubbockiPseudochromis dixurus, Forktail dottybackPseudochromis flavivertex, Sunrise dottybackPseudochromis fridmani, Orchid dottybackPseudochromis olivaceus, Olive dottybackPseudochromis pesi, Pale dottybackPseudochromis sankeyi, Striped dottybackPseudochromis springeri, Blue-striped dottybackPseudochromis xanthochirPtereleotridaePtereleotris evides, Blackfin dartfishPtereleotris heteroptera, Blacktail gobyPtereleotris microlepis, Blue gudgeonPtereleotris zebra, Chinese zebra goby
RachycentridaeRachycentron canadum, Cobia
RhinobatidaeRhina ancylostoma, Bowmouth guitarfishRhynchobatus djiddensis, Giant guitarfish
ScaridaeBolbometopon muricatum, Green humphead parrotfishCalotomus viridescens, Viridescent parrotfishCetoscarus bicolor, Bicolour parrotfishChlorurus genazonatus, Sinai parrotfishChlorurus gibbus, Heavybeak parrotfishChlorurus sordidus, Daisy parrotfishHipposcarus harid, Candelamoa parrotfishLeptoscarus vaigiensis, Marbled parrotfishScarus caudofasciatus, Redbarred parrotfishScarus collana, Red Sea parrotfishScarus ferrugineus, Rusty parrotfishScarus frenatus, Bridled parrotfishScarus fuscopurpureus, Purple-brown parrotfishScarus ghobban, Blue-barred parrotfishScarus niger, Dusky parrotfishScarus psittacus, Common parrotfishScarus russelii, Eclipse parrotfishScarus scaber, Fivesaddle parrotfish
ScombridaeGrammatorcynus bilineatus, Double-lined mackerelGymnosarda unicolor, Dogtooth tuna
ScorpaenidaeDendrochirus brachypterus, Shortfin turkeyfishDendrochirus zebra, Zebra turkeyfishParascorpaena auritaParascorpaena mossambica, Mozambique scorpionfishPterois miles, Devil firefishPterois radiata, Radial firefishPterois russelii, Plaintail turkeyfishPterois volitans, Red lionfishScorpaenodes corallinusScorpaenodes guamensis, Guam scorpionfishScorpaenodes hirsutus, Hairy scorpionfishScorpaenodes parvipinnis, Lowfin scorpionfishScorpaenodes scaber, Pygmy scorpionfishScorpaenodes varipinnis, Blotchfin scorpionfishScorpaenopsis barbata, Bearded scorpionfishScorpaenopsis diabolus, False stonefishScorpaenopsis gibbosa, Humpback scorpionfishScorpaenopsis oxycephala, Tassled scorpionfishScorpaenopsis venosa, Raggy scorpionfishScorpaenopsis vittapinnaSebastapistes bynoensis, Byno scorpionfishSebastapistes cyanostigma, Yellowspotted ScorpionfishSebastapistes strongia, Barchin scorpionfish
SerranidaeAethaloperca rogaa, Redmouth grouperAnyperodon leucogrammicus, Slender grouperAulacocephalus temminckii, Goldribbon soapfishCephalopholis argus, Peacock hindCephalopholis boenak, Chocolate hindCephalopholis hemistiktos, Yellowfin hindCephalopholis miniata, Coral hindCephalopholis oligosticta, Vermilion hindCephalopholis sexmaculata, Sixblotch hindDiploprion drachi, Yellowfin soapfishEpinephelus areolatus, Areolate grouperEpinephelus chlorostigma, Brownspotted grouperEpinephelus coeruleopunctatus, Whitespotted grouperEpinephelus coioides, Orange-spotted grouperEpinephelus fasciatus, Blacktip grouperEpinephelus fuscoguttatus, Brown-marbled grouperEpinephelus hexagonatus, Starspotted grouperEpinephelus lanceolatus, Giant grouperEpinephelus malabaricus, Malabar grouperEpinephelus merra, Honeycomb grouperEpinephelus morrhua, Comet grouperEpinephelus polyphekadion, Camouflage grouperEpinephelus stoliczkae, Epaulet grouperEpinephelus summana, Summan grouperEpinephelus tauvina, Greasy grouperEpinephelus tukula, Potato grouperGrammistes sexlineatus, Sixline soapfishLiopropoma mitratum, Pinstriped bassletLiopropoma susumi, Meteor perchPlectranthias nanus, Bownband perchletPlectranthias winniensis, Redblotch bassletPlectropomus areolatus, Squaretail coralgrouperPlectropomus pessuliferus, Roving coralgrouperPseudanthias cichlopsPseudanthias heemstrai, Orangehead anthiasPseudanthias lunulatus, Lunate goldiePseudanthias squamipinnis, Sea goldiePseudanthias taeniatusPseudogramma megamycterumVariola louti, Yellow-edged lyretail
SiganidaeSiganus argenteus, Streamlined spinefootSiganus javus, Streaked spinefootSiganus luridus, Dusky spinefootSiganus rivulatus, Marbled spinefootSiganus stellatus, Brownspotted spinefoot
SillaginidaeSillago sihama, Silver sillago
SoleidaeAesopia cornuta, Unicorn solePardachirus marmoratus, Finless soleSoleichthys heterorhinosSolenostomidaeSolenostomus cyanopterus, Ghost pipefishSolenostomus paradoxus, Harlequin ghost pipefish
SparidaeAcanthopagrus bifasciatus, Twobar seabreamArgyrops filamentosus, SoldierbreamCheimerius nufar, Santer seabreamDiplodus noct, Red Sea seabreamPolysteganus coeruleopunctatus, Blueskin seabreamRhabdosargus haffara, Haffara seabreamRhabdosargus sarba, Goldlined seabream
SphyraenidaeSphyraena barracuda, Great barracudaSphyraena flavicauda, Yellowtail barracudaSphyraena forsteri, Bigeye barracudaSphyraena jello, Pickhandle barracudaSphyraena obtusata, Obtuse barracudaSphyraena putnamae, Sawtooth barracudaSphyraena qenie, Blackfin barracuda
SphyrnidaeSphyrna lewini, Scalloped hammerheadSphyrna mokarran, Great hammerhead
StegostomatidaeStegostoma fasciatum, Zebra shark
SynanceiidaeInimicus filamentosus, Two-stick stingfishSynanceia verrucosa, Stonefish
SyngnathidaeAcentronura tentaculataChoeroichthys brachysoma, Short-bodied pipefishCorythoichthys flavofasciatus, Network pipefishCorythoichthys nigripectus, Black-breasted pipefishCorythoichthys schultzi, Schultz's pipefishCosmocampus banneri, Roughridge pipefishCosmocampus maxweberi, Maxweber's pipefishDoryrhamphus dactyliophorus, Ringed pipefishDoryrhamphus excisus abbreviatusDoryrhamphus multiannulatus, Many-banded pipefishHalicampus dunckeri, Duncker's pipefishHalicampus grayi, Gray's pipefishHalicampus macrorhynchus, Ornate pipefishHalicampus mataafae, Samoan pipefishHippocampus histrix, Thorny seahorseHippocampus kuda, Spotted seahorseMicrognathus andersonii, Shortnose pipefishPhoxocampus belcheri, Rock pipefishSiokunichthys bentuviaiSyngnathoides biaculeatus, Alligator pipefishTrachyrhamphus bicoarctatus, Double-ended pipefish
SynodontidaeSaurida gracilis, Gracile lizardfishSaurida tumbil, Greater lizardfishSaurida undosquamis, Brushtooth lizardfishSynodus indicus, Indian lizardfishSynodus variegatus, Variegated lizardfishTrachinocephalus myops, Snakefish
TerapontidaePelates quadrilineatus, Fourlined teraponTerapon theraps, Largescaled therapon
TetraodontidaeArothron diadematus, Masked pufferArothron hispidus, White-spotted pufferArothron immaculatus, Immaculate pufferArothron stellatus, Starry toadfishCanthigaster cyanospilota, Blue-spotted tobyCanthigaster margaritata, Pearl tobyCanthigaster pygmaea, Pygmy tobyLagocephalus sceleratus, Silver-cheeked toadfishTorquigener flavimaculosusTorpedinidaeTorpedo sinuspersici, Marbled electric ray
TripterygiidaeEnneapterygius abeli, Yellow triplefinEnneapterygius altipinnis, Highfin triplefinEnneapterygius tutuilae, High-hat TriplefinHelcogramma steinitzi, Red triplefinNorfolkia brachylepis, Redfin Triplefin
UranoscopidaeUranoscopus sulphureus, Whitemargin stargazer
XenisthmidaeXenisthmus polyzonatus'', Bullseye wriggler

See also
List of red sea sharks
Fish of the Red Sea
List of deep water fish of the Red Sea

References
Fishbase

red
'